Darko Nikač (born 15 May 1990) is a Montenegrin footballer who plays as a forward for Montenegrin side FK Sutjeska Nikšić. He debuted for Montenegro's national team in 2013.

Club career

Budućnost
Nikač made his professional debut with Budućnost in the 2009–10 season. In the summer of 2013, he was in negotiations for a transfer to FC Wil 1900. In February 2014, Strømsgodset IF negotiated with Budućnost over Nikač, but Nikač remained at Budućnost.

Pune
Nikač signed for Indian I-League side Pune for the 2014-15 I-League. He scored his first goal for the club, in a 9th-minute strike against Bengaluru FC. He then scored against Shillong Lajong in a 5-2 Win. By the end of the season, Nikač scored five goals in 16 games for Pune.

Return to Budućnost
On June 26, 2015, it was announced that Nikač returned to Budućnost after one season in India. According to Montenegrin newspaper Vijesti, Nikač's new contract with Budućnost might be as short as six months, but the details were not disclosed as of June 2015.

International career
He received his first full international cap on 17 November 2013, coming on in the 78th minute in a friendly against Luxembourg.

Career statistics

Club

References

External sources

 
 

1990 births
Living people
Footballers from Podgorica
Association football forwards
Montenegrin footballers
Montenegro under-21 international footballers
Montenegro international footballers
FK Budućnost Podgorica players
OFK Titograd players
OFK Grbalj players
Pune FC players
MTK Budapest FC players
Navbahor Namangan players
FK Iskra Danilovgrad players
KF Teuta Durrës players
SC Gjilani players
Montenegrin First League players
Montenegrin Second League players
I-League players
Nemzeti Bajnokság I players
Uzbekistan Super League players
Kategoria Superiore players
Football Superleague of Kosovo players
Montenegrin expatriate footballers
Expatriate footballers in India
Montenegrin expatriate sportspeople in India
Expatriate footballers in Hungary
Montenegrin expatriate sportspeople in Hungary
Expatriate footballers in Uzbekistan
Montenegrin expatriate sportspeople in Uzbekistan
Expatriate footballers in Albania
Montenegrin expatriate sportspeople in Albania
Expatriate footballers in Kosovo
Montenegrin expatriate sportspeople in Kosovo